The Baseball Register, also known as the Official Baseball Register, was an annual almanac of baseball player statistics, published by The Sporting News. It was published in May after player changes had been made, at the start of the season. It ceased publication with its 2007 edition. In its first years of publication, from 1940 until 1965, it bore the subtitle "The Game's Four Hundred".

References

Official Baseball Register, 1974 edition, Joe Marcin, Mike Douchant, editors.

Annual magazines published in the United States
Sports magazines published in the United States
Defunct magazines published in the United States
Major League Baseball books
Magazines established in 1940
Magazines disestablished in 2007
Magazines published in North Carolina